Tyland Barn, north of Maidstone, is the headquarters of the Kent Wildlife Trust.

It has  a nature park which is designed to show the variety of habitats in the county, such as a pond, grassland, a chalk bank, a shingle beach, scrub and hedges.

References

Kent Wildlife Trust